"March of Public Peace Preservation", usually known as the "Thai Police's Honour Song" from its first verse, and also called the "March of the Royal Thai Police" or merely "Police March", is a well-known Thai patriotic song and march of the Royal Thai Police. The music was composed by Nat Thawarabut (นารถ ถาวรบุตร) and the lyrics, by Kaeo Atchariyakun (แก้ว อัจฉริยกุล), both from the government musical band Suntharaphon (สุนทราภรณ์)

Musician Charin Nanthanakhon (ชรินทร์ นันทนาคร) wrote in the column "Sixth Crossroad of Entertainment" (หกแยกบันเทิง), published in Siam Rath newspaper in 1996, that the march was composed around 1957 upon order of Police General Phao Siyanon (เผ่า ศรียานนท์), Director General of the Police Department at the time being and infamous dictator. Siyanon requested that the song must prevail over the "March of the Royal Thai Army" (มาร์ชกองทัพบก). In the said article, Nanthanakhon also noted that Thawarakun told him playfully: "I didn't want to compose this song at all, Charin. I don't really like police. They always come to arrest me while I'm playing cards."

In spite of Thawarabut's personal feeling towards the Royal Thai Police, he and Atchariyakun completed the work quickly. Siyanon was very impressed by it, especially by the verse "Unavoidable is death, but unceasable is our bravery" ("เกิดมาแล้วต้องตาย ชาติชายเอาไว้ลายตำรวจไทย"), to the extent that he awarded bundles of monies to them together with complimentary letters and his namecards on which he signed and wrote "For you. When you are caught playing cards, show this to the police."

Lyrics

References

See also 
 Royal Thai Police

Thai patriotic songs
Asian anthems
Thai military marches
Law enforcement in Thailand